Lycoming County is a county in the Commonwealth of Pennsylvania. As of the 2020 census, the population was 114,188. Its county seat is Williamsport.

Lycoming County comprises the Williamsport metropolitan statistical area.

History

Formation of the county
Lycoming County was formed from Northumberland County on April 13, 1795. The county was larger than it is today. It took up most of the land that is now north central Pennsylvania. The following counties have been formed from land that was once part of Lycoming County: Armstrong, Bradford, Centre, Clearfield, Clinton, Indiana, Jefferson, McKean, Potter, Sullivan, Tioga, Venango, Warren, Forest, Elk and Cameron.

Lycoming County was originally named Jefferson County in honor of Thomas Jefferson. This name proved to be unsatisfactory. The name change went through several steps. First a change to Lycoming County was rejected, next the name Susquehanna County was struck down as was Muncy County, before the legislature revisited and settled on Lycoming County for Lycoming Creek, the stream that was the center of the pre-Revolutionary border dispute.

County "firsts"
1615: The first European in Lycoming County was Étienne Brûlé. He was a voyageur for New France. Brule descended the West Branch Susquehanna River and was held captive by a local Indian tribe near what is now Muncy before escaping and returning to Canada.

1761: The first permanent homes were built in Muncy. Three log cabins were built by Bowyer Brooks, Robert Roberts and James Alexander.

1772: The first gristmill is built on Muncy Creek by John Alward

1775: The first public road is built along the West Branch Susquehanna River. The road followed Indian trails from Fort Augusta in what is now Sunbury to Bald Eagle Creek near modern-day Lock Haven.

1786: The first church built in the county was Lycoming Presbyterian church in what was known as Jaysburg and is now the Newberry section of Williamsport.

1792: The first sawmill was built on Lycoming Creek by Roland Hall.

1795: The first elections for Lycoming County government are held soon after the county was formed from Northumberland County. The elected officers were Samuel Stewart, county sheriff and the first county commissioners were John Hanna, Thomas Forster and James Crawford. Andrew Gregg was elected to represent Lycoming County in the United States Congress, William Hepburn was voted to the Pennsylvania State Senate and Flavel Roan, Hugh White and Robert Martin served as representatives in the Pennsylvania General Assembly.

1823: The county government funded the construction of the first bridges over Loyalsock and Lycoming Creeks.

1839: The first railroad is built. It connected Williamsport with Ralston in northern Lycoming County. The railroad followed Lycoming Creek.

Geography
Lycoming County is the largest county in Pennsylvania by land area and second-largest by total area; it is larger than the state of Rhode Island. The county has a humid continental climate which is warm-summer (Dfb) except in lower areas near the river which are hot-summer (Dfa). Average monthly temperatures in downtown Williamsport average from 26.5 °F in January to 72.4 °F in July, while in Trout Run they average from 25.5 °F in January to 71.2 °F in July.

Appalachian Mountains and Allegheny Plateau

Lycoming County is divided between the Appalachian Mountains in the south, the dissected Allegheny Plateau (which also appears mountainous) in the north and east, and the valley of the West Branch Susquehanna River between these.

West Branch Susquehanna River
The West Branch of the Susquehanna enters Lycoming County from Clinton County just west of the borough of Jersey Shore, which is on the northwest bank of the river. The river then flows generally east and a little north with some large curves for 15 miles (24 kilometers) to the city of Williamsport, followed by the borough of Montoursville (both on the north bank) as well as the boroughs of Duboistown and South Williamsport (on the south bank).

The river flows just north of Bald Eagle Mountain (one of the northernmost ridges of the Ridge-and-valley Appalachians) through much of its course in Lycoming County, but it passes the end of the mountain and turns south just before the borough of Muncy (on the east bank). It continues south past the borough of Montgomery and leaves Lycoming County, where it forms the border between Union and Northumberland Counties. From there the West Branch merges with the North Branch Susquehanna River at Northumberland, Pennsylvania, and then flows south to the Chesapeake Bay.

Major creeks and watersheds

The major creeks of Lycoming County are all tributaries of the West Branch Susquehanna River. On the north or left bank of the river they are (from west to east): Pine Creek (and its tributary Little Pine Creek) which the river receives just west of Jersey Shore; Larrys Creek, which the river receives about 7 km (4 mi) south of Salladasburg; Lycoming Creek which the river receives in western Williamsport; Loyalsock Creek which the river receives between Williamsport and Montoursville; and Muncy Creek (and its tributary Little Muncy Creek), which the river receives just north of Muncy. Loyalsock and Muncy Creeks are also the major watersheds of Sullivan County.

Finally there is White Deer Hole Creek, the only major creek in Lycoming County on the right bank (i.e. south and west) of the river. It is south of Bald Eagle Mountain, and flows from west to east. The river receives it at the village of Allenwood in Gregg Township in Union County. Other creeks found on the right bank (south and west) of the West Branch Susquehanna River in Lycoming County are relatively minor, including Antes Creek in the Nippenose valley (in Limestone and Nippenose Townships), Mosquito Creek (at Duboistown), Hagermans Run (at South Williamsport), and Black Hole Creek (at Montgomery).

The entire county is in the Chesapeake Bay watershed. The percent of the county drained by each creek's watershed is as follows: Pine Creek, 15.27%; Little Pine Creek, 11.25% (if these two are considered together, 26.52%); Larry's Creek, 7.17%; Lycoming Creek, 17.80%; Loyalsock Creek, 13.23%; Muncy Creek, 4.82%; Little Muncy Creek, 5.86% (if these two are considered together, 10.68%); and White Deer Hole Creek, 4.40%. Minor creeks account for the rest.

Adjacent counties

 Bradford County (northeast)
 Clinton County (west)
 Columbia County (southeast)
 Montour County (south)
 Northumberland County (south)
 Potter County (northwest)
 Sullivan County (east)
 Tioga County (north)
 Union County (southwest)

Demographics

As of the census of 2000, there were 120,044 people, 47,003 households, and 31,680 families residing in the county. The population density was 97 people per square mile (38/km2). There were 52,464 housing units at an average density of 42 per square mile (16/km2). The racial makeup of the county was 93.9% White, 4.3% Black or African American, 0.2% Native American, 0.4% Asian, <0.1% Pacific Islander, 0.3% from other races, and 0.9% from two or more races. 0.7% of the population were Hispanic or Latino of any race. 38.5% were of German, 11.7% American, 9.0% Irish, 7.4% Italian and 7.3% English ancestry.

There were 47,003 households, out of which 29.9% had children under the age of 18 living with them, 53.1% were married couples living together, 10.3% had a female householder with no husband present, and 32.6% were non-families. 26.9% of all households were made up of individuals, and 11.9% had someone living alone who was 65 years of age or older. The average household size was 2.44 and the average family size was 2.95.

In the county, the population was spread out, with 23.3% under the age of 18, 9.7% from 18 to 24, 27.5% from 25 to 44, 23.4% from 45 to 64, and 16.0% who were 65 years of age or older. The median age was 38 years. For every 100 females there were 95.60 males. For every 100 females age 18 and over, there were 92.80 males.

2020 Census

Law and government

|}

County Commissioners
 Scott Metzger, Chairman
 Tony R. Mussare, Vice Chairman
 Richard Mirabito, Secretary

Law enforcement agencies
 Pennsylvania State Police
 Williamsport Police Department
 Lycoming County Sheriff's Office
 South Williamsport Police Department (and DuBoistown borough)
 Tiadaghton Valley Regional Police Department (and Cummings, McHenry, Porter, Piatt & Nippenose Townships)
 Old Lycoming Township Police Department (and Hepburn & Lycoming Townships)
 Montoursville Police Department
 Muncy Police Department (and Brady Township)
 Muncy Township Police Department
 Hughesville Police Department (and Picture Rocks Borough)
 Montgomery Police Department
 Pennsylvania College of Technology Police Department
 Lycoming County Probation and Parole Department

Fire departments
 Williamsport Bureau of Fire - Station 1 (HQ on Walnut Street, Engine 14-1 runs out of Station 14)
 Woodward Township VFC - Station 2
 Independent Hose of Jersey Shore - Station 3
 South Williamsport VFC - Station 5 (Quarters of MICU1-91, Merger of former Stations 10 & 11)
 Nippenose Valley VFC - Station 6
 Nisbet VFC - Station 7
 DuBoistown VFC Station - 8
 Clinton Township VFC - Station 12
 Montgomery VFC - Station 13
 Old Lycoming Township VFC - Station 14 (Quarters of MICU91)
 Hepburn Township VFC - Station 15
 Trout Run VFC - Station 16
 Ralston VFC - Station 17
 Loyalsock VFC - Station 18 (Quarters of MICU18)
 Williamsport Regional Airport - Station 19
 Montoursville Fire Department - Station 20 (Quarters of Medic 1-91)
 Washington Township VFC - Station 21
 Eldred TWP VFC - Station 22
 Muncy Township VFC - Station 23
 Hughesville VFC - Station 24
 Pluntetts Creek VFC - Station 25
 Picture Rocks VFC - Station 26
 Lairdsville VFC - Station 27
 Waterville VFC - Station 28
 Antes Fort VFC - Station 31
 Unityville VFC - Station 32 (Dispatched by Montour County)
 Brown Township VFC - Station 35
 Black Forest VFC - Station 36
 Muncy Area VFC - Station 39
 Citizens Hose of Jersey Shore - Station 45 (Quarters of MICU94 & MICU1-94)

Pennsylvania House of Representatives
 Jamie Flick, Republican, Pennsylvania's 83rd Representative District
 Joseph D. Hamm, Republican, Pennsylvania's 84th Representative District

Pennsylvania State Senate
 Gene Yaw, Republican, Pennsylvania's 23rd Senatorial District

United States House of Representatives
 Dan Meuser, Republican, Pennsylvania's 9th congressional district
 Glenn Thompson, Republican, Pennsylvania's 15th congressional district

United States Senate
 John Fetterman, Democrat
 Bob Casey, Jr., Democrat

Education

Colleges
 Lycoming College
 Pennsylvania College of Technology

Public school districts

 Canton Area School District (also in Bradford and Tioga Counties) Canton Warriors
 East Lycoming School District Hughesville Spartans
 Jersey Shore Area School District (also in Clinton County) Jersey Shore Bulldogs
 Loyalsock Township School District Loyalsock Lancers
 Montgomery Area School District Montgomery Red Raiders
 Montoursville Area School District Montoursville Warriors
 Muncy School District Muncy Indians
 South Williamsport Area School District South Williamsport Mountaineers
 Southern Tioga School District (also in Tioga County) Liberty Mountaineers, Mansfield Tigers, and North Penn Panthers
 Wellsboro Area School District (also in Tioga County) Wellsboro Hornets
 Williamsport Area School District Williamsport Millionaires

Other public entities
 Lycoming Career Technical Center - Hughesville
 BLAST Intermediate Unit #17

Non public entities
 Bald Eagle School - Montgomery
 Brookside School - Montgomery
 Countryside School - Jersey Shore
 Fairfield Academy - Montoursville
 LCCCs Children's Development Center - Williamsport
 Mountain View Christian School - South Williamsport
 Mountain View School - Williamsport
 Pine Woods Nippenose Valley - Jersey Shore
 Scenic Mountain Parochial School - Allenwood
 St John Neumann Regional Academy - Williamsport (accepting OSTC students)
 St John Neumann Regional Academy at Faxon - Williamsport
 St John Neumann Regional Academy High School Campus - Williamsport (accepting OSTC students)
 Valley Bell School - Montgomery
 West Branch School - Williamsport
 White Deer Valley School - Montgomery
 Williamsport Christian School - Williamsport

Data from EdNA database maintained by Pennsylvania Department of Education, July 2012

Libraries
There are six public libraries in Lycoming County:
 James V. Brown Library (Williamsport)
 Hughesville Area Public Library
 Jersey Shore Public Library
 Dr. W.B. Konkle Memorial Library (Montoursville)
 Montgomery Area Public Library
 Muncy Public Library

There are also four Link libraries in the county.

Transportation

Primary highways

Airports
There are only two public use airports in the county. The Williamsport Regional Airport, has daily non-stop flights to Philadelphia, and a FBO for private jets and charters. There is also the Jersey Shore Airport, which only has a grass runway and can only handle light aircraft.

Recreation
There are three Pennsylvania state parks in Lycoming County:
 Little Pine State Park
 Susquehanna State Park
 Upper Pine Bottom State Park

There are parts of two Pennsylvania state forests in Lycoming County:
 Tiadaghton State Forest in the southern and western parts of the county,
 Loyalsock State Forest in the eastern part of the county.

Communities

Under Pennsylvania law, there are four types of incorporated municipalities: cities, boroughs, townships, and, in at most two cases, towns. The following cities, boroughs and townships are located in Lycoming County:

City
 Williamsport (county seat)

Boroughs

 Duboistown
 Hughesville
 Jersey Shore
 Montgomery
 Montoursville
 Muncy
 Picture Rocks
 Salladasburg
 South Williamsport

Townships

 Anthony
 Armstrong
 Bastress
 Brady
 Brown
 Cascade
 Clinton
 Cogan House
 Cummings
 Eldred
 Fairfield
 Franklin
 Gamble
 Hepburn
 Jackson
 Jordan
 Lewis
 Limestone
 Loyalsock
 Lycoming
 McHenry
 McIntyre
 McNett
 Mifflin
 Mill Creek
 Moreland
 Muncy
 Muncy Creek
 Nippenose
 Old Lycoming
 Penn
 Piatt
 Pine
 Plunketts Creek
 Porter
 Shrewsbury
 Susquehanna
 Upper Fairfield
 Washington
 Watson
 Wolf
 Woodward

Census-designated places
Census-designated places are geographical areas designated by the U.S. Census Bureau for the purposes of compiling demographic data. They are not actual jurisdictions under Pennsylvania law. Other unincorporated communities, such as villages, may be listed here as well.
 Faxon
 Garden View
 Kenmar
 Oval
 Rauchtown (mostly in Clinton County)

Unincorporated communities

 Antes Fort
 Balls Mills
 Barbours
 Cammal
 Cedar Run
 Chemung
 Hoppestown
 Jersey Mills
 Lairdsville
 Leolyn
 Linden
 Nisbet
 Pennsdale
 Proctor
 Ralston
 Roaring Branch
 Slate Run
 Unityville

Population ranking
The population ranking of the following table is based on the 2010 census of Lycoming County.

† county seat

See also

 List of people from Lycoming County, Pennsylvania
 National Register of Historic Places listings in Lycoming County, Pennsylvania

References
Specific

General
 Official Lycoming County Map showing all townships, villages, boroughs, cities, county roads, rivers, creeks, and some streams

 
1795 establishments in Pennsylvania
Populated places established in 1795
Articles needing expert attention from October 2011
Counties of Appalachia
Methane